The 47th edition of the annual Clásico RCN was held from October 13 to October 21, 2007 in Colombia. The stage race with an UCI rating of 2.3 started with a prologue in Yopal and finished in Popayán.

Stages

2007-10-13: Yopal – Yopal (6.7 km)

2007-10-14: Yopal – Villanueva (145.3 km)

2007-10-15: Villavicencio – Bogotá (120.2 km)

2007-10-16: Honda – Villamaría (130 km)

2007-10-17: Manizales – Envigado (189.3 km)

2007-10-18: Caldas – Pereira (180.3 km)

2007-10-19: Pereira – Cali (214.4 km)

2007-10-20: Cali – Popayán (123.8 km)

2007-10-21: Circuito Urbano en Popayán (28.9 km)

Final classification

See also 
 2007 Vuelta a Colombia

References 
 Clásico RCN 2007
 pedalear

Clásico RCN
Clasico RCN
Clasico RCN